"Kiss of Life" is the thirteenth single to be released by Japanese singer Ken Hirai. It was released on May 16, 2001. The single's title song was the theme song to the drama Love Revolution.

The song sold a total of 650,000 copies and reached number 2 on the Oricon weekly chart, remaining in the chart for a total of 29 weeks. It remained Hirai's most successful single until August 2002, when he released his first #1 single, a cover of My Grandfather's Clock.

Track list
Kiss of Life
Written and composed by Ken Hirai and Masahito Nakano.
Cat
Written by Ken Hirai. Composed by Uru.
Miracles (Silent Poets remix)
Kiss of Life (less vocal)

References

2001 singles
Ken Hirai songs
Japanese television drama theme songs
Songs written by Ken Hirai
Defstar Records singles
2001 songs